Barbro Ingmårie Svensson (sometimes listed as Ing-Marie; married name Blom, born 13 January 1950) is a  retired Swedish sprint canoer. Competing in the K-1 500 m event she placed seventh and eights at the 1968 and 1972 Olympics, respectively. She is married to the Norwegian Olympic sprinter canoer Per Blom.

References

1950 births
Canoeists at the 1968 Summer Olympics
Canoeists at the 1972 Summer Olympics
Living people
Olympic canoeists of Sweden
Swedish female canoeists